The 1984–85 season was the 39th season in Rijeka’s history and their 23rd season in the Yugoslav First League. Their 4th place finish in the 1983–84 season meant it was their 11th successive season playing in the Yugoslav First League.

Competitions

Yugoslav First League

Classification

Results summary

Results by round

Matches

First League

Source: rsssf.com

Yugoslav Cup

Source: rsssf.com

UEFA Cup

Source: worldfootball.net

Squad statistics
Competitive matches only.  Appearances in brackets indicate numbers of times the player came on as a substitute.

See also
1984–85 Yugoslav First League
1984–85 Yugoslav Cup
1984–85 UEFA Cup

References

External sources
 1984–85 Yugoslav First League at rsssf.com
 Prvenstvo 1984.-85. at nk-rijeka.hr
 1984–85 UEFA Cup at rsssf.com

HNK Rijeka seasons
Rijeka